You Ought to Think About Me is an album by organist Jimmy McGriff recorded in 1990 and released on the Headfirst label.

Reception 

Allmusic's Scott Yanow said: "Although Jimmy McGriff temporarily switched labels from Milestone to Headfirst in 1990, his brand of swinging funk and blues-oriented jazz was virtually unchanged ... The results are predictably excellent".

Track listing
All compositions by Jimmy McGriff except where noted
 "The Way You Look Tonight" (Jerome Kern, Dorothy Fields) – 6:01
 "You Ought to Think About Me" – 4:15
 "America the Beautiful" (Samuel A. Ward, Katharine Lee Bates) – 3:13
 "One O'Clock/C-Jam" (Count Basie/Duke Ellington) – 7:11
 "Over the Rainbow" (Harold Arlen, Yip Harburg) – 5:13
 "Ain't No Mountain High Enough" (Nickolas Ashford, Valerie Simpson) – 3:54
 "McGriff's Blues" (Rodney Jones) – 4:44
 "One Minute 'Til Six" (Bill Easley) – 8:56
 "Evita" – 5:17
 "Goin' Home" (Jones) – 9:10

Personnel
Jimmy McGriff – Hammond/Goff organ, piano
Stanton Davis – trumpet
 Dennis Wilson – trombone
Bill Easley – alto saxophone, tenor saxophone, soprano saxophone
Rodney Jones – guitar, Roland GR-50 strings, bass, effects
David Jackson, Jr. – bass
Bernard Purdie − drums

References

 

Jimmy McGriff albums
1990 albums